4O or 4-O may refer to:

4° (also 4o), an abbreviation for Quarto
4 Degrees and Beyond International Climate Conference, discussing issues involving a 4 °C rise in average global surface temperature 
4o Sector, see  Quaternary sector of the economy
4O, IATA code for Interjet
4º, abbreviation for fourth
4º Supermag Rally Italia Sardinia, see 2007 Rally d'Italia Sardegna

See also
4° (disambiguation)
O4 (disambiguation)